Kraenzlinella is a genus of flowering plants from the orchid family, Orchidaceae, first described as a genus in 1903.  It is native to S Mexico, Central America, and South America.

Species
 Kraenzlinella anfracta (Luer) Luer - Tolima region in Colombia
 Kraenzlinella echinocarpa (C.Schweinf.) Luer - Peru, Ecuador
 Kraenzlinella erinacea (Rchb.f.) Solano - Oaxaca, Chiapas, Central America, Colombia, Venezuela, Guyana, Ecuador, Peru, Bolivia
 Kraenzlinella gigantea (Lindl.) Luer - Peru
 Kraenzlinella hintonii (L.O.Williams) Solano - Guerrero
 Kraenzlinella lappago (Luer) Luer - El Oro + Napo Provinces in Ecuador
 Kraenzlinella phrynoglossa (Luer & Hirtz) Luer - Azuay Province in Ecuador
 Kraenzlinella rinkei Luer - Costa Rica
 Kraenzlinella sigmoidea (Ames & C.Schweinf.) Luer - Costa Rica
 Kraenzlinella tunguraguae (F.Lehm. & Kraenzl.) Kuntze ex Engl. & Prantl - Colombia, Ecuador, Peru

formerly included and moved to other genera Anathallis Echinosepala Specklinia
 Kraenzlinella platyrachis (Rolfe) Rolfe = Specklinia pfavii (Rchb.f.) Pupulin & Karremans
 Kraenzlinella shuarii (Luer) Luer = Echinosepala shuarii (Luer) Luer
 Kraenzlinella smaragdina (Luer) Luer = Anathallis smaragdina (Luer) Pridgeon & M.W.Chase

See also 
 List of Orchidaceae genera

References

External links 

Pleurothallidinae
Pleurothallidinae genera